The 2020 Africa Futsal Cup of Nations qualification was the qualification process organized by the Confederation of African Football (CAF) to determine the participating teams for the 2020 Africa Futsal Cup of Nations, the 6th edition of the international men's futsal championship of Africa.

Teams
A total of 10 teams entered the qualifying rounds.

Format
Qualification ties were played on a home-and-away two-legged basis. If the aggregate score was tied after the second leg, the away goals rule would be applied, and if still level, the penalty shoot-out would be used to determine the winner (no extra time would be played).

The five winners of the preliminary round qualified for the final tournament.

Schedule
The schedule of the qualifying rounds was as follows.

Preliminary round
Morocco qualified automatically as hosts, and Egypt and Mozambique also qualified automatically as the other African teams in the 2016 FIFA Futsal World Cup, while the remaining five spots were determined by the qualifying rounds, which took take place in October 2019.

|}

Libya won 12–6 on aggregate.

Angola won 13–1 on aggregate.

South Africa won 11–1 on aggregate. South Africa withdrew from the tournament on 15 January 2020 as they refused to play in Laayoune of Western Sahara due to the Western Sahara conflict and were replaced by Mauritius.

Qualified teams
The following eight teams qualified for the final tournament. South Africa, which originally qualified, withdrew and were replaced by Mauritius.

1 Bold indicates champion for that year. Italic indicates host for that year.

Goalscorers

Notes

References

External links
2020 Africa Futsal Cup of Nations - futsalplanet.com

2020